Daniel Edwin Gleeson (born 17 February 1985) is an English footballer who plays for Histon. He is 191 cm (6'3") tall and plays as a right back.

Career
Born in Cambridge, Cambridgeshire, Gleeson joined Cambridge United as a trainee in 2001 and his debut on 1 November 2003, in Division Three against Kidderminster Harriers. He made a total of 51 Football League and Conference appearances for Cambridge before signing for Notts County in July 2006. He rejoined Cambridge on loan in March 2007, where he has been an established player for the Conference National side. The deal was made permanent in the summer.

Gleeson scored his first senior goal in the 7–0 win against Weymouth in March 2007.

Following a great start to the 2007–08 season, he was rewarded by his first England National Game XI (England 'C') cap in November and signed a new deal to 2010.

On 19 May 2010, Gleeson joined Cambridge's Conference rivals Luton Town on a free transfer, signing a two-year contract. He was a regular in the side during the 2010–11 season, also playing in Luton's play-off final defeat to AFC Wimbledon. Gleeson played far fewer games the next season due to a combination of injury and being kept out of the team by Curtis Osano. On 30 May 2012, Luton manager Paul Buckle did not offer Gleeson a new contract, and he subsequently left the club.

On 2 July 2012, Gleeson signed for Lowestoft Town.

Personal life
He was born just minutes from the Abbey and watched Cambridge United with his family before joining the club as a scholar.

References

External links

 

1985 births
Living people
English footballers
England semi-pro international footballers
Cambridge United F.C. players
Notts County F.C. players
Luton Town F.C. players
English Football League players
National League (English football) players
Lowestoft Town F.C. players
Association football defenders